"Mi Corazón" is a song by the Algerian DJ DJ Sem and features vocals by French singer Marwa Loud.

Music video
"Mi Corazon" was released on June 28, 2017 on YouTube. As of April 2021, it has 223 million views.

Charts

Certifications

References

2017 singles
2017 songs